Holger Haxthausen (1892-1959) was professor of dermatology at the University of Copenhagen. He took up the position in 1931 in succession to Carl Rasch.

References 

1892 births
1959 deaths
Academic staff of the University of Copenhagen
Danish dermatologists